Édouard Fulbert Pigeot (22 January 1912 – 27 September 1982) was a French wrestler. He competed in the men's Greco-Roman middleweight at the 1936 Summer Olympics.

References

1912 births
1982 deaths
French male sport wrestlers
Olympic wrestlers of France
Wrestlers at the 1936 Summer Olympics
20th-century French people